National City is a city located in the South Bay region of the San Diego metropolitan area, in southwestern San Diego County, California.

The population was 58,582 at the 2010 census, up from 54,260 at the 2000 census. National City is the second-oldest city in San Diego County, having been incorporated in 1887.

History

Human presence within the modern city limits of National City may have begun as early as 130,000 years ago, as allegedly evidenced at the Cerutti Mastodon site. Archaic period sites have been found along Sweetwater River which runs through the city limits of modern-day National City. Before the entry of Spanish into the area which modern day National City occupies was part of the territory of the Diegueño tribe, also known as Kamai, and later Kumeyaay. Later in the late eighteenth and early nineteenth century there was a Kumeyaay village, north of the modern National City boundaries, on Chollas Creek.

After independence from Spain, in 1810, the Mexican government renamed it Rancho de la Nación (Ranch of the Nation). Governor Pío Pico granted Rancho de la Nación to his brother-in-law John (Don Juan) Forster in 1845. President Andrew Johnson, in issuing the land patent, listed the name as simply "The National Ranch", the English translation of the land grant name, "Rancho de la Nación".

In 1868, Frank Kimball and his brothers Warren and Levi, contractors and builders from San Francisco, purchased the entire rancho and thus began the foundation of the city, retaining the National name.

Frank Kimball first brought novelty and change to the area by building his personal residence. His home included a bathtub as well as hot running water, making it the first modern house in the entire county. However, it was more than his personal innovative endeavors that allowed the region to flourish. By constructing the first roads and railroad in what is now National City, Frank and his brothers most notably were responsible for introducing modern transportation to the residents of the community. The brothers also implemented the area's first post office and a wharf for sea-bound imports and exports. These large ventures, coupled with smaller personal missions, both contributed to the overall goal of creating a community unparalleled to the times. A lasting mark of the Kimballs was the trees they imported and planted from Europe and Asia, accomplished via a partnership with the U.S. Department of Agriculture. These trees can be found dotted throughout the city to this very day. It was the passion and influence of the Kimballs as well as other early pioneers that made way for the city's incorporation on September 17, 1887.

I the mid-20th century, businesses on National Avenue catered to the entertainment of sailors stationed at Naval Base San Diego, and became known as the "Mile of Bars". In the late 20th century, the city, seeking to end the association of the street with drinking culture, urged the growth of automobile dealerships, transforming the area to be known as the "Mile of Cars". Part of the change of business types was the closure of a Pussycat Theater in 1999. The last of the bars that was on the "Mile of Bars" was the Trophy Lounge, which lasted until at least 2004. In the early 21st century, the city began to utilize eminent domain to create new developments; this met some criticism, to include on Reason TV in a video narrated by Drew Carey.

Immigrant sanctuary 
National City is home to an estimated 25,000 immigrants and refugees, or two out of every five residents.

Former Mayor Nick Inzunza declared National City an immigrant sanctuary city on September 30, 2006 in a proclamation he presented to immigrants' rights activists during dueling rallies that brought about 400 people to City Hall. This was the result of a statement Mayor Inzunza made on National Public Radio on September 8, 2006. This proclamation divided the city between the stance of the ex-mayor and the federal and state regulations regarding this matter.

On November 7, 2006, Ron Morrison was elected mayor of National City. On November 28, 2006, Mayor Morrison appeared on the KPBS program Full Focus with Gloria Penner and was asked if National City will continue to be a sanctuary city for illegal immigrants. Morrison responded, "absolutely not."

More recently, on June 19, 2017, the National City Council voted unanimously to adopt a Compassionate City resolution in support of immigrants, a reversal of former Mayor Ron Morrison's stance, and a callback to former Mayor Nick Inzunza's position on the issue.

Geography
National City is bounded by San Diego to the north and northeast, Bonita to the southeast, and Chula Vista to the south across the Sweetwater River. San Diego Bay lies to the immediate west of the city. Also, within the boundaries of National City on the eastern side of town is the unincorporated area of San Diego County known as Lincoln Acres.
National City is 15 minutes away from the US–Mexico Border (Tijuana).

National City has road access by the Interstate 5, Interstate 805, and California State Route 54, in addition to surface streets. National City Blvd, which once served as part of the historic U.S. Route 101, still serves as a north–south arterial street parallel to Highland Ave. Plaza Blvd and 30th Street/Sweetwater Road serve as east–west arterial routes. It has rail access through the San Diego Trolley's Blue Line. The nearest commercial airport is San Diego International Airport.

In 2012, National City was honored as the most walkable city in San Diego County.  It currently holds a walk score of 71, among the highest scores for cities of similar size. However, its current score also puts National City among bigger cities like Seattle, Washington (74) and Portland, Oregon (66). San Diego's current walk score is 56.

Communities

Although there are no specific communities identified by the city of National City, certain areas have self-identified as communities. The Old Town community is bordered by McKinley Ave. (to the west) and National City Blvd. (to the east), and 24th Street (to the south) and 8th Street (to the north). While Lincoln Acres is an unincorporated area of San Diego County, it is located wholly within the boundaries of the incorporated city of National City and both share the postal code (91950). The South Port Business Center, an industrial park in which many businesses operate, is bordered by I-5 to the west, National City Blvd. to the east Mile of Cars Way (24th St.) to the north, and W. 28th St. to the south. The residents near Las Palmas and El Toyon Parks have neighborhood councils where they can voice their concerns with the city's elected officials.

The Neighborhood Council Program was developed in an effort to improve communication with the community and to bring services directly to National City residents. The program helps to unify neighbors to further enhance the image of the city, instilling civic pride into neighborhoods. Regular monthly meetings are held in each of the three Neighborhood Councils. Agenda topics are driven by resident requests, current events, and a desire by city officials to keep residents abreast of new programs and upcoming developments. Meetings are usually attended by police and fire officials, as well as members of the City Council.

Besides attending regular meetings, Neighborhood Council participants assist the city in improving their neighborhoods by volunteering during clean-up and beautification events and by helping to reduce crime. Residents also participate in family events sponsored by the Neighborhood Council Program such as National Night Out and Movies in the Park, as well as other city-sponsored events.

Climate

National City's climate is characterized by warm, dry summers and mild winters, with most of the annual precipitation falling between December and March. The city has a mild climate year-round, with an average of 201 days above  and low rainfall ( annually). Frequently, particularly during the "May gray/June gloom" period, a thick "marine layer" of cloud cover will keep the air cool and damp within a few miles of the coast.

On average, the warmest month is August. The highest recorded temperature was 108 °F in September 1988. On average, the coolest month is December. The lowest recorded temperature was 15 °F in April 2003. The maximum average precipitation occurs in February.

Ecology
Like most of Southern California and the San Diego County region, the majority of National City's current area was originally occupied by chaparral, a plant community made up mostly of drought-resistant shrubs. National City's broad city limits encompass the San Diego National Wildlife Refuge and the most northern area of the Sweetwater Marsh National Wildlife Refuge. The Sweetwater River runs from the Cuyamaca Mountains, through National City and Chula Vista via a flood control channel (natural route as opposed to a canal) and empties into the San Diego Bay. The eastern areas of National City tend to have canyons and ridges with an existing wildlife.

Demographics

2020
Most recent data from the 2020 United States census reported that National City had a population estimate of 61,394, with a population density of 8,050 people per square mile (3,108.1/km2). Recent demographic breakdown estimates are as follows:  7,122 (11.6%) are non-Hispanic White, 2,947 (4.8%) African American, 307 (0.5%) Native American, 11,358 (18.5%) Asian, 307 (0.5%) Pacific Islander, and 1,842 (3.0%) from two or more races. Hispanic or Latino of any race were 38,985 (63.5%). The median household income (in 2019 dollars) is $47,119, and persons living in poverty was estimated at 18.3%

2010
The 2010 United States Census reported that National City had a population of 58,582. The racial makeup of National City was 24,725 (42.2%) White (11.7% non-Hispanic White), 3,054 (5.2%) African American, 618 (1.1%) Native American, 12,402 (20.2%) Asian, 482 (0.8%) Pacific Islander, 3,638 (6.2%) from other races, 2,829 (4.8%) from two or more races and 16,175 (27.6%) Other. Hispanic or Latino of any race were 36,911 persons (63.0%).

The Census reported that 52,830 people (90.2% of the population) lived in households, 5,341 (9.1%) lived in non-institutionalized group quarters, and 411 (0.7%) were institutionalized.

There were 15,502 households, out of which 7,402 (47.7%) had children under the age of 18 living in them, 7,376 (47.6%) were opposite-sex married couples living together, 3,437 (22.2%) had a female householder with no husband present, 1,300 (8.4%) had a male householder with no wife present. There were 959 (6.2%) unmarried opposite-sex partnerships, and 83 (0.5%) same-sex married couples or partnerships. 2,694 households (17.4%) were made up of individuals, and 1,226 (7.9%) had someone living alone who was 65 years of age or older. The average household size was 3.41. There were 12,113 families (78.1% of all households); the average family size was 3.79.

The population was spread out, with 14,939 people (25.5%) under the age of 18, 9,472 people (16.2%) aged 18 to 24, 15,892 people (27.1%) aged 25 to 44, 12,076 people (20.6%) aged 45 to 64, and 6,203 people (10.6%) who were 65 years of age or older. The median age was 30.2 years. For every 100 females, there were 105.5 males. For every 100 females age 18 and over, there were 106.5 males.

The homeowner vacancy rate was 2.1%; the rental vacancy rate was 5.6%. 19,165 people (32.7% of the population) lived in owner-occupied housing units and 33,665 people (57.5%) lived in rental housing units.

2000
As of the census of 2000, there were 54,260 people, 15,018 households, and 11,804 families residing in the city.
 Mexican – 53%
 Filipino – 19%
 Black or African American - 6%
 Other Hispanic or Latino - 5%
 German - 3%
 Irish - 2%
 English - 2%
 Italian - 1%
 American Indian tribes, specified - 1%
 French (except Basque) - 1%
 Puerto Rican - 1%
 Japanese - 1%
 Scottish-Irish - 1%
 Subsaharan African - 1%
 Polish - 1%
 Russian - 1%
 Central American: - 1%
 Greek -1%
As of 2007, 19.5% of National City residents have incomes listed below the poverty level, a figure above the 12.4% California state average.  In 2000, the estimated household income was $29,826. , the estimated household income is $39,158, which is below the California state average of $59,958.

Crime
National City had, at some point through the 1980s, one of the highest homicide rates in all of Southern California. In 1993, the city had the second-highest violent crime rate in all of California. Crime was, in large part, one reason the city earned the moniker "Nasty City" and, through the late 1980s and early 1990s, it averaged roughly one homicide per month, which was significant, for a city of barely 50,000.

Although crime has dropped dramatically since the 1980s and 1990s, National City still has significant gang and drug activity, and has led San Diego County in crime through the 2000s. In a recent study among California cities with the highest violent and property crime rates over 2014–2016, National City ranked 9th, with a violent crime rate of 299.0 over that three-year period. More recent data from 2016 to 2020 shows that National City was at or near the top in overall crime, and at the top in violent crime per FBI Index Crime rate data by jurisdiction in San Diego County.

Economy

Tourism
With tourism being a major industry in San Diego County, in January 2012, the National City Chamber of Commerce and National City lodging businesses formed the National City Tourism Marketing District as a benefit assessment district to help fund marketing and sales promotion efforts for city lodging businesses.  The NCTMD includes all lodging business (hotels, motels and inns), existing and in the future, available for public occupancy located within the city limits boundaries. These include the Best Western Marina Gateway, Carlill Auto Court, Clarion South Bay, Grand Plaza Inn, Holiday Inn Express, Howard Johnson Express, National City Motel, Paradise Motel, Rodeway Inn, Stardust Inn, Super 8 Motel and Sweetwater Inn. An annual assessment of 2.5% of gross short-term room rental revenue collected by lodging business goes to fund the NCTMD and its activities of promoting the safety and enhanced image of National City in order to increase tourism as well as to market National City as a tourist, meeting and event destination.

Top employers
According to the city's 2010 Comprehensive Annual Financial Report, the top employers in the city were:

Arts and culture

Museums and other points of interest 
 The National City Mile of Cars is recognized as one of the first "auto malls" in the world.
 National City's  along the San Diego Bay is part of Naval Base San Diego, the largest U.S. Naval base on the west coast.
 National City Depot - The National City California Southern Railroad Depot, built in 1882, served as the first Pacific Coast terminus station of the Santa Fe Railway system's transcontinental railroad. The station was the West Coast general office and figured prominently in Santa Fe's effort to break the economic and transportation monopoly of California held by the Central/Southern Pacific Railroads. The first transcontinental trains arrived in November 1885, resulting in one of the largest land booms in the history of California. Of the original five transcontinental railroad terminus stations, this unique Italianate designed station is the lone survivor. Location: 900 West 23rd St, National City. Listed as California Historical Landmark no. 1023.
 Westfield Plaza Bonita is a shopping mall in National City that attracts customers from all around the South Bay region of San Diego County. It is one of the only completely enclosed (all indoor) shopping malls in the county.
 Paradise Valley Hospital, a 301-bed acute care facility founded by Ellen White, an Adventist, in 1902 as Paradise Valley Sanitarium. The hospital is owned and operated by Prime Healthcare Services.
 Cafe La Maze (est. 1941) is recognized as one of National City's most historic restaurants.
 Highland Avenue -  Car cruising route.
 Olivewood Gardens, the old Victorian style house that John T. Walton lived in.
 Brick Row on Heritage Square, 909 A Avenue; Designed by San Diego architect R. C. Ball (who designed Folsom Prison), it was constructed by Frank Kimball in 1887 for $30,000. These 10 individual row houses were to be used by the executives of the Santa Fe Railroad. This architectural style is unique to this region and was molded after the row houses of Philadelphia and similar eastern cities. It was hoped that the railroad VIPs would not only feel at home surrounded by familiar architecture, but also be impressed by the cosmopolitan appearance of the young city. All the apartments have a formal dining room with fireplace, a kitchen, a parlor with fireplace, a butler's pantry, and four bedrooms upstairs. Twelve-inch-thick interlocking brick walls divide the units. The brickwork on the row houses was laid with an artistic eye to break the severe lines of the long walls. The bricks above the second story are set upright at an angle. A one-story wooden porch runs the length of the building. Listed on the National Register of Historic Places, it now is an integral part of National City's Heritage Square. Each of the 10 units is privately owned and maintained; however, there is a protective covenant on the facade, so the exterior will always be in keeping with the Victorian surroundings.

Government

Beginning in 2022, the city council will be elected by a district system rather that at-large, which was favored by Filipino American residents who believed their vote was diluted in the at-large system.

Education
National City's 10 public elementary schools are within the National School District 

Elementary schools
 Central
 El Toyon
 Ira Harbison — Blue Ribbon School 2006; California Distinguished School 2004
 John Otis
 Kimball — California Distinguished School 2004
 Las Palmas
 Lincoln Acres
 Olivewood
 Palmer Way
 Rancho de la Nación (formerly New Horizons School)

Charter school
 Integrity Charter School, a K–8 Charter school
 The Charter School of San Diego (Plaza Bonita Mall)

National City's public middle and high schools are within the Sweetwater Union High School District

Middle school
 National City Middle School

Junior High school
 Granger Junior High School — California's 2010, 2013, 2016, 2019, 2020 Schools To Watch

High school
 Sweetwater High School

Private schools
 San Diego Academy — A Seventh-day Adventist K–12 school
 Faithful Ambassadors Bible Baptist Academy — PreK–12
 Gospel Light Christian School — PreK–12

Libraries
In August 2005, the National City Public Library opened the doors of its newly built,  state-of-the art facility. The library offers more than 160,000 books and has one of the largest computer centers in the State of California's public library system with over 60 computer units.

On December 18, 1884, Frank Kimball opened the city's first public library in his own home. In April 1884, the library was moved to the downstairs room of Granger Hall on National Avenue. In 1895, it was moved to the Boyd Block, currently McKinley and visually, 16th Street. From 1911 to 1954, National City operated its Carnegie Public Library in the present site of the National City Civic Center. The library operated in the present day Art Center since 1954 until the opening of the new location in 2005.

The National City Public Library houses the Kile Morgan Local History Room which houses a significant number of original archives and manuscripts of the National City founding families, as well as maps, artifacts, high school year books and scrapbooks.

Notable people

 John Baldessari — conceptual artist known for his work featuring found photography and appropriated images; born in National City.
 Joe Corona — soccer player for Club Tijuana and the United States, Joe attended Sweetwater High School.
 Andrew Cunanan - born in National City, a serial killer who claimed five people, most notably including Gianni Versace, in 1997.
 Gail Devers — three-time Olympic gold medalist
 Donnie Edwards — San Diego Chargers 2002–2006 National Football League player
 Benji Gil — former Major League Baseball player, first-round pick
 Rosie Hamlin — singer, 1960s song "Angel Baby"
 Joe Orrell - former Major League Baseball pitcher, born in National City
 Anna M. Longshore Potts — established the Paradise Hotel and Sanitarium in National City in 1889 
 Skid Roper — musician
 Dan Saleaumua — former player in the National Football League; born in National City.
 Juan Vargas — Representative of California's 51st congressional district, born in National City
 Tom Waits — singer/songwriter and musician
 Lukas Walton - billionaire heir, grandson of Sam Walton, the founder of Walmart

In popular culture
 The film Return of the Killer Tomatoes (1988) was filmed in National City.
 Scenes from the film South of 8 (2016) were shot in National City.

Sister cities
National City has two sister cities as designated by Sister Cities International:
  Tecate, Mexico
  Olongapo, Philippines

References

Further reading

External links
 
 
 City-Data.com Comprehensive Statistical Data and more about National City

 
Cities in San Diego County, California
San Diego metropolitan area
South Bay (San Diego County)
Incorporated cities and towns in California
Populated places established in 1868
Populated places established in 1887
1868 establishments in California
1887 establishments in California